Glory is a 1956 American musical film directed by David Butler and starring Margaret O'Brien, Walter Brennan and Charlotte Greenwood.

Plot
Agnes Tilbee and granddaughter Clarabell are excited about their Fairwood Farm's new foal, which they name Glory, although because it's a filly, her chances of becoming a championship racehorse aren't great.

The farm has financial difficulties. Clarabell is attracted to wealthy Chad Chadburn, who allows Glory to board and train at his stable. Chad is said to be engaged to Candy Trent, a rich snob whose fast car sometimes spooks the horses.

Agnes can barely afford her feed bill, which is why in spite of having parted ways, her former trainer Ned Otis pays the $50 she owes. Clarabell is heartsick when Agnes says the horse will need to be put up for auction. She enters Glory in races, but the filly isn't ready yet and always loses. Glory also goes lame, requiring care and a long rest.

A singer, Hoppy Hollis, takes an interest in Clarabell, who joins him on a song called "Glory' that becomes a success and earns them money. Agnes loses the horse in a poker game to Sobbing Sam Cooney, who is Chad's trainer, but Chad arranges for her to win the horseback.

Neighbors put up the entry fee for the Kentucky Derby so that Glory can be entered. Ned returns to train her, and Glory's surprising victory is a happy ending for all, including newly in love Clarabell and Chad.

Cast
Margaret O'Brien as Clarabell Tilbee (singing voice was dubbed by Norma Zimmer)
Walter Brennan as Ned Otis
Charlotte Greenwood as Miz Agnes Tilbee
John Lupton as Chad Chadburn
Byron Palmer as Hoppy Hollis
Lisa Davis as Candy Trent

Songs
Calypso - Sung partially by Margaret O'Brien (dubbed by Norma Zimmer)
Gettin' Nowhere Road - Sung by Margaret O'Brien (dubbed by Norma Zimmer) and Byron Palmer
Happy Time Again - Sung partially by Byron Palmer
Glory - Sung by Byron Palmer, Margaret O'Brien (dubbed by Norma Zimmer) and Chorus
Kentucky Means Paradise - Sung by Byron Palmer, Margaret O'Brien (dubbed by Norma Zimmer) and Chorus

All songs written by M.K. Jerome (music) and Ted Koehler (lyrics).

References

External links

1956 films
1950s musical drama films
American musical drama films
Films directed by David Butler
Films set in Kentucky
Films shot in Kentucky
American horse racing films
1956 drama films
RKO Pictures films
1950s English-language films
1950s American films